Cathrine Rasmussen (born 4 March 1965) is a Norwegian equestrian athlete and trainer and a businesswoman. She competed at the 2010 FEI World Equestrian Games and at the 2011 FEI European Championships in Rotterdam and at the 2013 European Dressage Championship in Herning.

Biography
Catherine started riding at an age of three and has been always passionate about equestrian. She studied Humanities at the Indiana University Bloomington in the United States and started focusing on her professional equestrian career after graduation. She worked six years for Hasse Hoffmann in Denmark and moved later to Germany to train with Herbert Rehbein.

Personal life
Catherine owns a stake in Rasmussengruppen, which is her family business. Her father is Einar Johan Rasmussen, a Norwegian engineer and ship owner. She lives both in Aarhus, Denmark and in her birthplace Kristiansand. She has two children and is fluent in English, Norwegian and Danish.

References

1965 births
Living people
Norwegian equestrians
Norwegian dressage riders
Norwegian female equestrians
Norwegian expatriates in Denmark
Sportspeople from Kristiansand